Royston railway station serves the town of Royston in Hertfordshire, England. Trains serving the station are operated by Thameslink and Great Northern.

The station is an important stop on the commuter line between King's Cross and Cambridge as the majority of semi-fast services between London and Cambridge stop at Royston - one exception being the 'Cambridge Cruiser' fast services from London.  It is also the last station before Cambridge with platforms capable of handling 12-car trains.  Therefore, it is used by many commuters, not only from Royston but also from smaller stations north of Royston who transfer from stopping services to faster trains at the station.

The station was opened by the Royston and Hitchin Railway in October 1850 as its initial eastern terminus.  The line was subsequently extended as far as  the following year and through to Cambridge by the Eastern Counties Railway in 1852.  The latter company took out a lease on the Royston company from then until 1866 and ran trains between Cambridge and the Great Northern Railway's main line junction at Hitchin until its lease expired.  Thereafter the GNR took over and began running through trains from Cambridge to Kings Cross from 1 April 1866.

Royston station is still labeled as Royston (Herts) on tickets and information displays, even though the station serving the town with the same name in South Yorkshire closed in 1968.

Electrification
The railway from London King's Cross to Royston was electrified in 1978. Class 312 electric trains from King's Cross terminated at Royston; passengers wishing to travel to Cambridge had to change to a connecting diesel multiple unit train. From 1988 the whole line from London to Cambridge was electrified, ending the need to change trains at Royston. Full services commenced on 2 May 1988. Network SouthEast commissioned the electrification from Royston to Cambridge as a 'fill-in' scheme to link the wired routes either side (the ex-ECR main line electrification north of Bishops Stortford had been inaugurated the previous year).

Infrastructure
Both Up and Down lines through Royston station are signalled bi-directionally, meaning that Royston is the only place on the Cambridge Line where a train can overtake one ahead of it. The Signalling is controlled by Kings Cross Power Signal Box.

The station is located on a long sweeping curve, reducing the line speed in the Up direction to 50 mph, and a differential speed of 50/65 mph in the Down direction.

Services 
Off-peak, all services at Royston are operated by Thameslink using  EMUs. 

The typical off-peak service in trains per hour is:

On weekends, one of the hourly services between London and Cambridge terminates at Royston. On Sundays, the service between Brighton and Cambridge is reduced to hourly.

References

External links 

Railway stations in Hertfordshire
DfT Category D stations
Former Great Northern Railway stations
Railway stations served by Govia Thameslink Railway
Railway stations in Great Britain opened in 1850
Royston, Hertfordshire